Matt Walker (born 25 May 1999) is a British downhill mountain biker. He won the 2020 UCI Downhill World Cup.

Major results
2016
 4th Overall UCI Junior DH World Cup
1st Cairns
2017
 1st  UCI Junior DH World Championships
 3rd Overall UCI Junior DH World Cup
1st Fort William
2018
 1st  National DH Championships
2020
 1st  Overall 2020 UCI DH World Cup

References

Living people
Downhill mountain bikers
1999 births
British male cyclists
UCI Mountain Bike World Champions (men)
20th-century British people
21st-century British people